The Pakistan women's cricket team toured South Africa to play against the South Africa women's cricket team in January and February 2021. The tour consisted of three Women's One Day Internationals (WODIs) and three Women's Twenty20 Internationals (WT20Is). Originally, some of the fixtures were scheduled to be played at the City Oval in Pietermaritzburg. However, on 10 January 2021, Cricket South Africa updated the tour itinerary with all the matches being played at the Kingsmead Cricket Ground in Durban.

Ahead of the series, Pakistan's captain Bismah Maroof withdrew from the tour due to family reasons. Javeria Khan was named as Pakistan's captain in her absence. South Africa's captain, Dane van Niekerk, was also ruled out of the series after recovering from a back injury. Suné Luus was named as South Africa's captain in place of van Niekerk.

In the opening WODI match, South Africa beat Pakistan by three runs, after the hosts scored 200/9 batting first. South Africa won the second WODI by 13 runs to take an unassailable lead in the series. The hosts won the third and final WODI by 32 runs, winning the series 3–0.

Javeria Khan was ruled out of Pakistan's squad for the first WT20I due to an injury, with Aliya Riaz leading the side in her absence. South Africa went on to win the opening WT20I by eight wickets. Aliya Riaz also lead Pakistan in the second WT20I, but South Africa won the match by seven wickets to take the series. Javeria Khan returned for the final WT20I, hitting an unbeaten 56 runs. Pakistan went on to win the match by eight runs, to register their first win on the tour, with South Africa winning the series 2–1.

Squads

WODI series

1st WODI

2nd WODI

3rd WODI

WT20I series

1st WT20I

2nd WT20I

3rd WT20I

Notes

References

External links
 Series home at ESPN Cricinfo

Pakistan 2020-21
South Africa 2020-21
International cricket competitions in 2020–21
2021 in women's cricket
2021 in Pakistani women's sport